The 1995 Big West Conference men's basketball tournament was held March 9–12 at the Thomas & Mack Center in Paradise, Nevada.

 defeated  76–69 in overtime to capture their third PCAA/Big West title. The 49ers subsequently received an automatic bid to the 1995 NCAA tournament.

Bracket

Denotes overtime period

References

Big West Conference men's basketball tournament
Tournament
Big West Conference men's basketball tournament
Big West Conference men's basketball tournament
Basketball competitions in the Las Vegas Valley
College basketball tournaments in Nevada